Whitworth may refer to:

Places

United Kingdom
Whitworth, County Durham, a former civil parish in England
Whitworth Hall, County Durham
Whitworth, Lancashire, a town in England
Whitworth Art Gallery, an art gallery in Manchester, England
Whitworth Gardens, Manchester
Whitworth Hall, Manchester, part of the University of Manchester 
Whitworth Park, Manchester
Whitworth Street, Manchester

Canada
Whitworth, Quebec, an Indian reserve in Canada

Other
Whitworth Ridge, Prince Charles Mountains, Mac. Robertson Land, Antarctica

People
Whitworth (surname)

Other uses
Whitworth rifle, a British made rifle used by the Confederacy in the American Civil War
70-pounder Whitworth naval gun and 120-pounder Whitworth naval gun, naval guns made on a similar principle
Baron Whitworth, two titles in the Peerage of Ireland
Whitworth University, a private, liberal-arts institution in Spokane, Washington
Whitworth Park Academy, a secondary school in Spennymoor, County Durham, England
Whitworths, a dried fruit, home baking and snack products company
British Standard Whitworth (BSW), a specification for screw fasteners